

Acts of the Scottish Parliament

|-
| {{|Budget (Scotland) Act 2000|asp|2|20-03-2000|maintained=y|archived=n|An Act of the Scottish Parliament to make provision, for financial year 2000/01, for payments out of the Scottish Consolidated Fund and the application of sums otherwise payable into the Fund, for the maximum amount of relevant expenditure for the purposes of section 94(5) of the Local Government (Scotland) Act 1973 (c.65) and the maximum amounts of borrowing by certain statutory bodies; to make provision, for financial year 2001/02, for payments out of the Fund on a temporary basis; and for connected purposes.}}
|-
| {{|Census (Amendment) (Scotland) Act 2000|asp|3|10-04-2000|maintained=y|archived=n|An Act of the Scottish Parliament to amend the Census Act 1920 to enable particulars about religion to be gathered.}}
|-
| {{|Adults with Incapacity (Scotland) Act 2000|asp|4|09-05-2000|maintained=y|archived=n|An Act of the Scottish Parliament to make provision as to the property, financial affairs and personal welfare of adults who are incapable by reason of mental disorder or inability to communicate; and for connected purposes.}}
|-
| {{|Abolition of Feudal Tenure etc. (Scotland) Act 2000|asp|5|09-06-2000|maintained=y|archived=n|An Act of the Scottish Parliament to abolish the feudal system of land tenure; to abolish a related system of land tenure; to make new provision as respects the ownership of land; to make consequential provision for the extinction and recovery of feuduties and of certain other perpetual periodical payments and for the extinction by prescription of any obligation to pay redemption money under the Land Tenure Reform (Scotland) Act 1974; to make further provision as respects real burdens affecting land; to provide for the disentailment of land; to discharge all rights of irritancy held by superiors; to abolish the obligation of thirlage; to prohibit with certain exceptions the granting of leases over land for periods exceeding 175 years; to make new provision as respects conveyancing; to enable firms with separate personality to own land; and for connected purposes.}}
|-
| {{|Standards in Scotland's Schools etc. Act 2000|asp|6|14-07-2000|maintained=y|archived=n|An Act of the Scottish Parliament to make further provision as respects school education, the welfare of pupils attending independent schools and corporal punishment of pupils for whom school education is provided; to make further provision as respects School Boards; to make further provision as respects the functions, constitution and structure of the General Teaching Council for Scotland; to abolish the committee known as the Scottish Joint Negotiating Committee for School Education; to make further provision relating to the inspection of institutions within the higher education sector which educate and train persons to be, or persons who are, teachers in schools; and for connected purposes.}}
|-
| {{|Ethical Standards in Public Life etc. (Scotland) Act 2000|asp|7|24-07-2000|maintained=y|archived=n|An Act of the Scottish Parliament to establish a framework for securing the observance of high standards of conduct by councillors and other persons holding public appointments; and to repeal section 2A of the Local Government Act 1986 and make provision as to how councils are to exercise functions which relate principally to children.}}
|-
| {{|Education and Training (Scotland) Act 2000|asp|8|07-08-2000|maintained=y|archived=n|An Act of the Scottish Parliament to make provision for the payment of grants in respect of the education and training of certain individuals.}}
|-
| {{|Bail, Judicial Appointments etc. (Scotland) Act 2000|asp|9|09-08-2000|maintained=y|archived=n|An Act of the Scottish Parliament to change the law about bail; to enable alteration in the number of judges in the Inner House of the Court of Session; to abolish temporary sheriffs and create a new kind of sheriff; to change the law about justices of the peace; and to abolish district court prosecutions brought on behalf of or by local authorities.}}
|-
| {{|National Parks (Scotland) Act 2000|asp|10|09-08-2000|maintained=y|archived=n|An Act of the Scottish Parliament to make provision for National Parks.}}
|-
| {{|Regulation of Investigatory Powers (Scotland) Act 2000|asp|11|28-09-2000|maintained=y|archived=n|An Act of the Scottish Parliament to regulate surveillance and the use of covert human intelligence sources.}}
|-
| {{|Sea Fisheries (Shellfish) Amendment (Scotland) Act 2000|asp|12|02-11-2000|maintained=y|archived=n|An Act of the Scottish Parliament to amend section 7(4) of the Sea Fisheries (Shellfish) Act 1967 in respect of rights of several fishery.}}
}}

See also
List of Acts of the Scottish Parliament

References
Current Law Statutes 2000. Volume 3. Chapters asp 1 to asp 12.

2000